Cedar Hill is a city in Robertson County, Tennessee, United States. The population was 301 at the 2020 census.

History

Jo Byrns, who became Speaker of the House of Representatives, was born in Cedar Hill on July 28, 1869.  The local elementary school and high school are named for him.

In the 1940s and 1950s Cedar Hill had a population of about 700, with around 10 stores.  The economy was based on services to surrounding farmers; the main crop in the area was tobacco.

By the 1960s, crops were more diversified and more farmers had cars, enabling them to travel to the county seat of Springfield, about nine miles away.  Also at about this time, the construction of the Interstate Highway System, namely Interstate 24 and Interstate 65, removed much of Cedar Hill's through traffic.  These factors led to a steady decline in population and development, but the area has begun to move forward in a positive direction through community building and revitalization efforts.

In 2006, Jo Byrns Elementary School opened in Cedar Hill, serving grade Pre-K to 5.

Geography
Cedar Hill is located along U.S. Route 41 in northwestern Robertson County.  Springfield lies to the southeast, and Adams lies to the northwest.

The Tennessee Wildlife Resource Agency owns the Cedar Hill Swamp WMA site which features early- to late-successional hardwood forest dominated by pin oak and sweetgum that dominate the 200 acres found at Cedar Hill Swamp WMA. A few acres of overgrown fields are found near the entrance.

The only remaining swampland is on private property adjacent to the WMA on the opposite side of the CSX railroad tracks.

Demographics

2020 census

As of the 2020 United States census, there were 301 people, 113 households, and 78 families residing in the city.

2000 census

As of the census of 2000, there were 298 people, 98 households, and 79 families residing in the city. The population density was 442.9 people per square mile (171.7/km2). There were 111 housing units at an average density of 165.0 per square mile (64.0/km2). The racial makeup of the city was 77.18% White, 21.48% African American, 0.34% Native American, 0.67% from other races, and 0.34% from two or more races. Hispanic or Latino of any race were 1.01% of the population.

There were 98 households, out of which 37.8% had children under the age of 18 living with them, 58.2% were married couples living together, 19.4% had a female householder with no husband present, and 18.4% were non-families. 16.3% of all households were made up of individuals, and 10.2% had someone living alone who was 65 years of age or older. The average household size was 3.04 and the average family size was 3.41.

In the city, the population was spread out, with 29.9% under the age of 18, 8.1% from 18 to 24, 28.9% from 25 to 44, 23.5% from 45 to 64, and 9.7% who were 65 years of age or older. The median age was 34 years. For every 100 females, there were 94.8 males. For every 100 females age 18 and over, there were 90.0 males.

The median income for a household in the city was $34,688, and the median income for a family was $40,000. Males had a median income of $30,000 versus $20,000 for females. The per capita income for the city was $12,209. About 10.5% of families and 14.6% of the population were below the poverty line, including 27.6% of those under the age of eighteen and 27.8% of those 65 or over.

References

External links

Municipal Technical Advisory Service entry for Cedar Hill — information on local government, elections, and link to charter

Cities in Tennessee
Cities in Robertson County, Tennessee